The following is a list of media outlets based in Manhattan, Kansas.

Print

Newspapers
Manhattan has had at least one newspaper published for the town continuously since The Kansas Express published its first edition on May 21, 1859.  The following newspapers currently publish in Manhattan:
 Grass & Grain – agriculture news (published weekly)
 The Kansas State Collegian – Kansas State University student newspaper (published daily during academic term)
 Keynotes News for Older Kansans – senior citizen news (published bi-monthly)
 Kansas Free Press – news (published weekly)
 The Manhattan Mercury – news (published daily)

History
Manhattan had a number of newspapers in its early years.  Following is a timeline of 19th-century papers in the town:
 Kansas Express (1859–1926) – first newspaper in Manhattan, consolidated into The Manhattan Mercury
name changed to Independent in 1863, Standard in 1868, and Nationalist in 1870
 Kansas Radical (1866–1868) – second newspaper in Manhattan, consolidated into the Standard
 Manhattan Enterprise (1876–1909) – founded by father of Damon Runyon, consolidated into The Manhattan Mercury
 name changed to Manhattan Republic in 1882 
 The Manhattan Mercury (1884–present)

Radio
The following radio stations are licensed to and/or broadcast from Manhattan:

AM

FM

History
The first radio station licensed in Manhattan was 9YV, an experimental station operated by Kansas State University. In 1912 the station began a daily broadcast (in morse code) of the weather forecast, becoming the first radio station in the U.S. to air a regularly-scheduled forecast.

After a series of efforts to secure a more high-powered signal for the university – including a brief cooperation with John R. Brinkley's notorious KFKB – Kansas State was granted a license for KSAC, which began broadcasting with 500 watts of power on December 1, 1924. The station was reassigned to the frequency of AM 580 in 1928, and continued broadcasting on that frequency until November 27, 2002, when it made its last broadcast after the frequency was bought out by WIBW in Topeka, Kansas.

Television
Manhattan is in the Topeka, Kansas television market.

The following television stations are licensed to and/or broadcast from Manhattan:

History 
The history of television in Manhattan dates back to the "experimental era" of television history.  On March 9, 1932, the Federal Radio Commission granted Kansas State University a license to operate the television station W9XAK.  It was the first television station in Kansas. Activity on the station peaked in 1933 and 1934, with original programs being produced three nights a week.  On October 28, 1939, the station broadcast the Homecoming football game in Manhattan between Kansas State and Nebraska, which was the second college football game ever televised.  The station went off the air later in 1939.

References

Mass media in Kansas
Manhattan, Kansas